The women's 3000 metres event at the 2014 World Junior Championships in Athletics was held in Eugene, Oregon, USA, at Hayward Field on 24 July.

Medalists

Records

Results

Final
24 July
Start time: 20:15  Temperature: 21 °C  Humidity: 53 %

Intermediate times:
1000m: 3:03.84 Lilian Kasait Rengeruk
2000m: 6:07.39 Valentina Chepkwemoi Mateiko

Participation
According to an unofficial count, 16 athletes from 13 countries participated in the event.

References

External links
 WJC14 3000 metres schedule

3000 metres
Long distance running at the World Athletics U20 Championships
2014 in women's athletics